The 2016 FINA Diving World Series was the eighth edition of FINA Diving World Series. The series consisted of four legs: the first leg in Beijing, China; the second leg in Dubai, United Arab Emirates; the third leg in Windsor, Canada; and the fourth leg in Kazan, Russia.

Overall medal tally

Beijing leg 
The results of the Beijing leg are given below.

Medal table

Medal summary

Men

Women

Mixed

Dubai leg 
The results of the Dubai leg are given below.

Medal table

Medal summary

Men

Women

Mixed

Windsor leg 
The results of the Windsor leg are given below.

Medal table

Medal summary

Men

Women

Mixed

Kazan leg 
The results of the Kazan leg are given below.

Medal table

Medal summary

Men

Women

Mixed

References 

2016 in diving
FINA Diving World Series